Birthright is a 1938 American drama film directed, co-produced and co-written by Oscar Micheaux. Carman Newsome stars as a black Harvard graduate facing racism and discrimination after he returns to his small hometown in Tennessee, where he hoped to develop a school similar to Tuskegee Institute or Hampton Institute, both historically black colleges.

This is a talkie remake of Micheaux's 1924 silent film of the same name; both were adapted from white author T. S. Stribling's eponymous 1922 novel. Starring J. Homer Tutt, Micheaux's 1924 film was highly controversial for its graphic depiction of racism. The film is now considered lost.

Production 
The Birthright remake was first scheduled for release in 1937, but in January 1938 it was reported that filming was still taking place in Ridgefield, New Jersey. The crew was estimated to number 15 members.

Release
The exact date of the film's theatrical release is unclear, though it most likely occurred at some point in 1938. By mid-March 1939, the film was playing in theaters in Oakland, California. Black patrons of Oakland's Lincoln Theater threatened to boycott all black films (also known as race films) after having seen Birthright and Micheaux's 1935 film Temptation, as they accused the films of stereotyping blacks in the same manner as did mainstream Hollywood productions.

Legacy 
Although Micheaux's 1924 version of Birthright is considered a lost film, the portion of the 1939 version that survives was restored under Library of Congress supervision and has been preserved in its AFI Collection.

References

External links
 

1939 films
Films directed by Oscar Micheaux
1939 drama films
Race films
American black-and-white films
American drama films
Films based on American novels
1930s American films